Harry William Connolly (July 16, 1920 – January 14, 2006), also known as Mickey Connolly, was an American football halfback, fullback, and quarterback.

Connolly was born in Norwalk, Connecticut, in 1920 and attended Norwalk High School in that city. He played high school football at Norwalk under Frank Leahy, who coached at Norwalk on a part-time basis while serving as the line coach at Fordham. When Leahy became the head coach at Boston College, he recruited Connolly to play for him there. Connolly followed Leahy and played college football for the Boston College Eagles from 1940 to 1942. He was a versatile player known for his speed as a runner, passing ability, kicking, and also his propensity for intercepting passes on defense. In November 1942, The Boston Globe called him "B. C.'s best all-round athlete, most versatile football player".

Connolly was selected by the Steagles in the fifth round (37th overall pick) of the 1943 NFL Draft, but he never played in the NFL. Instead, he served in the Navy during World War II. He was assigned to the North Carolina Pre-Flight Cloudbusters football team.

After the war, Connolly played in the All-America Football Conference for the Brooklyn Dodgers in 1946.  He appeared in three games, two of them as a starter, and rushed for 18 yards on eight carries and completed two passes for 29 yards.

He died in 2006 in New Bedford, Massachusetts.

References

1920 births
2006 deaths
American football halfbacks
American football fullbacks
Brooklyn Dodgers (AAFC) players
Boston College Eagles football players
Players of American football from Connecticut
United States Navy personnel of World War II
Sportspeople from Norwalk, Connecticut